This article is about the particular significance of the year 1833 to Wales and its people.

Incumbents
Lord Lieutenant of Anglesey – Henry Paget, 1st Marquess of Anglesey 
Lord Lieutenant of Brecknockshire – Henry Somerset, 6th Duke of Beaufort
Lord Lieutenant of Caernarvonshire – Peter Drummond-Burrell, 22nd Baron Willoughby de Eresby 
Lord Lieutenant of Cardiganshire – William Edward Powell
Lord Lieutenant of Carmarthenshire – George Rice, 3rd Baron Dynevor 
Lord Lieutenant of Denbighshire – Sir Watkin Williams-Wynn, 5th Baronet    
Lord Lieutenant of Flintshire – Robert Grosvenor, 1st Marquess of Westminster 
Lord Lieutenant of Glamorgan – John Crichton-Stuart, 2nd Marquess of Bute 
Lord Lieutenant of Merionethshire – Sir Watkin Williams-Wynn, 5th Baronet
Lord Lieutenant of Montgomeryshire – Edward Herbert, 2nd Earl of Powis
Lord Lieutenant of Pembrokeshire – Sir John Owen, 1st Baronet
Lord Lieutenant of Radnorshire – George Rodney, 3rd Baron Rodney

Bishop of Bangor – Christopher Bethell 
Bishop of Llandaff – Edward Copleston 
Bishop of St Asaph – William Carey 
Bishop of St Davids – John Jenkinson

Events
29 January - In the United Kingdom general election, Sir John Edwards, 1st Baronet, defeats Tory candidate Panton Corbett to win the enlarged constituency of Montgomery for the Liberals.
2 April - Launch of HMS Royal William at Pembroke Dock. This is the first ship to be built there with over 100 guns.
26 May - John Etherington Welch Rolls of The Hendre, Monmouth, marries Elizabeth Long, granddaughter of the 7th Earl of Northesk.  They are the parents of John Rolls, 1st Baron Llangattock.
29 July - Lady Charlotte Bertie marries John Josiah Guest.
Autumn - The community of Gomer, Ohio, is founded in the USA by Welsh settlers.
date unknown
Isaac Williams becomes Dean of Trinity College, Oxford.
Adrian Stephens invents the steam whistle as a safety device for use at Dowlais Ironworks; he fails to patent it.
Abbey Cwmhir Hall is constructed on the site of an earlier house.

Arts and literature
Mold cape discovered.

New books
Sir Harford Jones Brydges - The Dynasty of the Kajars, translated from the original Persian manuscript
Eliza Constantia Campbell - Stories from the History of Wales

Music
David James - Myfyrdawd

Births
10 January – Richard Davies (Mynyddog), poet (d. 1877)
23 January – Sir Lewis Morris, poet (d. 1907)
29 January – David John, Mormon leader (d. 1908 in Utah)
February – Jacob Thomas, VC recipient (d. 1911)
6 July – David Hugh Jones (Dewi Arfon), poet (d. 1869)
12 July – John Hugh Evans, Wesleyan minister and temperance campaigner (d. 1886)
20 August – General Sir James Hills-Johnes, military leader (d. 1919)

Deaths
9 January – Sir Thomas Foley, admiral, 75
29 January – Thomas Evans, poet, 66
6 February – Robert Waithman, lord mayor of London, 69
26 February – Richard Jones, minister and writer, 61
4 May – William Morgan, scientist and actuary 82 
16 August – John Edwards-Vaughan, politician, 61
1 October – Thomas Beynon, archdeacon of Cardigan and patron of the arts, 88

References

 
Wales